The thorny-headed worm family Polymorphidae contains endoparasites which as adults feed mainly in fish and aquatic birds. When this taxon was erected by Meyer in 1931, a subfamily Polymorphinae was established in it. As the Polymorphidae as presently understood would then be monotypic, with no basal genera outside the Polymorphinae, the proposed subfamily is redundant for the time being and therefore most modern treatments simply omit it. Polymorphus minutus is an economically significant parasite in goose and duck farming.

Species

Polymorphidae contains the following species:

Andracantha Schmidt, 1975

Andracantha baylisi (Zdzitowiecki, 1986) Zdzitowiecki, 1989
Andracantha clavata (Goss, 1940)

Andracantha gravida (Alegret, 1941) Schmidt, 1975

Andracantha mergi Lundström, 1942
Andracantha phalacrocoracis (Yamaguti, 1939)
Andracantha tandemtesticulata Monteiro, Amato & Amato, 2006
Andracantha tunitae (Weiss, 1914)

Ardeirhynchus Dimitrova and Georgiev, 1994

Ardeirhynchus spiralis (Rudolphi, 1809)

Arhythmorhynchus Lühe, 1911

Arhythmorhynchus capellae (Yamaguti, 1935)
Arhythmorhynchus comptus Van Cleave & Rausch, 1950
Arhythmorhynchus distinctus Baer, 1956
Arhythmorhynchus eroliae (Yamaguti, 1939)
Arhythmorhynchus frassoni (Molin, 1858)
Arhythmorhynchus frontospinosus (Tubangui, 1935)
Arhythmorhynchus jeffreyi Schmidt, 1973
Arhythmorhynchus johnstoni Golvan, 1960
Arhythmorhynchus limosae Edmonds, 1971
Arhythmorhynchus petrochenkoi (Schmidt, 1969)
Arhythmorhynchus plicatus (von Linstow, 1883)
Arhythmorhynchus pumiliorostris Van Cleave, 1916
Arhythmorhynchus rubicundus (Molin, 1859)
Arhythmorhynchus siluricola Dollfus, 1929
Arhythmorhynchus suecicus Lundström, 1942
Arhythmorhynchus teres Van Cleave, 1920
Arhythmorhynchus tigrinus Moghe and Das, 1953
Arhythmorhynchus trichocephalus (Leuckart, 1876)
Arhythmorhynchus tringi Gubanov, 1952
Arhythmorhynchus turbidus (Van Cleave, 1937)
Arhythmorhynchus uncinatus (Kaiser, 1893) Lühe, 1912
Arhythmorhynchus villoti Golvan, 1994
Arhythmorhynchus xeni Atrashkevich, 1978

Bolbosoma Porta, 1908

Bolbosoma australis Skrjabin, 1972
Bolbosoma balaenae (Gmelin, 1790)
Bolbosoma brevicolle (Malm, 1867)
Bolbosoma caenoforme Heitz, 1920
Bolbosoma capitatum (Linstow, 1880)
Bolbosoma hamiltoni Baylis, 1929
Bolbosoma heteracanthis (Heitz, 1917)
Bolbosoma nipponicum Yamaguti, 1939
Bolbosoma scomberomori Wang, 1981
Bolbosoma tuberculata Skrjabin, 1970
Bolbosoma turbinella (Diesing, 1851)
Bolbosoma vasculosum (Rudolphi, 1819)

Corynosoma Lühe, 1904

Corynosoma alaskense Golvan, 1958
Corynosoma australe Johnston, 1937
Corynosoma beaglense Laskowski, Jeżewski & Zdzitowiecki, 2008
Corynosoma bullosum (Linstow, 1892)
Corynosoma cameroni Van Cleave, 1953
Corynosoma capsicum Golvan and Mokhayer, 1973
Corynosoma cetaceum Johnston & Best, 1942
Corynosoma curilense Gubanov, 1942
Corynosoma enhydri Morozov, 1940
Corynosoma eperlani (Linstow, 1884)
Corynosoma erignathi Stryukov, 2000
Corynosoma evae Zdzitowiecki, 1984
Corynosoma falcatum Van Cleave, 1953
Corynosoma gibsoni Zdzitowiecki, 1986
Corynosoma hadweni Van Cleave, 1953
Corynosoma hamanni (Linstow, 1892)
Corynosoma hannae Zdzitowiecki, 1984
Corynosoma longilemniscatus Machado-Filho, 1961
Corynosoma macrosomum Neiland, 1962
Corynosoma magdaleni Montreuil, 1958
Corynosoma mandarinca Oshmarin, 1963
Corynosoma obtuscens Lincicome, 1943
Corynosoma osmeri Fujita, 1921
Corynosoma otariae Morini and Boero, 1961
Corynosoma pseudohamanni Zdzitowiecki, 1984
Corynosoma pyriforme (Bremser, 1824)
Corynosoma rauschi Golvan, 1958
Corynosoma reductum (Linstow, 1905)
Corynosoma semerme (Forssell, 1904)
Corynosoma septentrionale Treshchev, 1966
Corynosoma seropedicus Machado-Filho, 1970
Corynosoma shackletoni Zdzitowiecki, 1978
Corynosoma simile Neiland, 1962
Corynosoma stanleyi Smales, 1986
Corynosoma strumosum (Rudolphi, 1802) Lühe, 1904
Corynosoma sudsuche Belopolskaia, 1958
Corynosoma validum Van Cleave, 1953
Corynosoma ventronudum Skrjabin, 1959
Corynosoma villosum Van Cleave, 1953
Corynosoma wegeneri Heinze, 1934

Diplospinifer Fukui, 1929

Diplospinifer serpenticola Fukui, 1929

Filicollis Lühe, 1911

Filicollis anatis (Schrank, 1788)
Filicollis trophimenkoi Atrashkevich, 1982

Ibirhynchus García-Valera, Pérez-Ponce de León, Aznar and Nadler, 2011

Ibirhynchus dimorpha (Schmidt, 1973)

Neoandracantha Amin & Heckmann, 2017

Neoandracantha peruensis Amin & Heckmann, 2017 

Polymorphus Lühe, 1911

The genus polymorphus uses amphipod crustaceans as intermediate hosts and various birds as final hosts. The genus used to be a larger group, but species that were formerly placed in the genus have now been placed in the genus Profilicollis based on morphological characteristics and the use of decapod crustaceans as intermediate hosts.

 Polymorphus actuganensis Petrochenko, 1949
 Polymorphus acutis Van Cleave and Starrett, 1940
 Polymorphus arctocephali Smales, 1986
 Polymorphus ariusis (Bilqees, 1971)
 Polymorphus biziurae Johnston and Edmonds, 1948
 Polymorphus boschadis (Schrank, 1788)
 Polymorphus brevis (Van Cleave, 1916)
 Polymorphus chongqingensis Liu, Zhang and Zhang, 1990
 Polymorphus cincli Belopolskaya, 1959
 Polymorphus contortus (Bremser in Westrumb, 1821)
 Polymorphus corynoides Skrjabin, 1913
 Polymorphus corynosoma Travassos, 1915
 Polymorphus crassus Van Cleave, 1924
 Polymorphus cucullatus Van Cleave and Starrett, 1940
 Polymorphus diploinflatus Lundström, 1942
 Polymorphus fatimaae Khan, Dharejo, Birmani and Bilqees, 2008
 Polymorphus fulicai Birmani, Dharejo and Khan, 2011
 Polymorphus gavii Hokhlova, 1965
 Polymorphus inermis Travassos, 1923
 Polymorphus karachiensis (Bilqees, 1971)
 Polymorphus kostylewi Petrochenko, 1949
 Polymorphus magnus Skrjabin, 1913
 Polymorphus marchii (Porta, 1910)
 Polymorphus marilis Van Cleave, 1939
 Polymorphus mathevossianae Petrochenko, 1949
 Polymorphus meyeri Lundström, 1942
 Polymorphus miniatus (von Linstow, 1896)
 Polymorphus minutus (Goeze, 1782)
 Polymorphus mohiuddini Muti-ur-Rahman, Khan, Bilqees and Khatoon, 2008
 Polymorphus mutabilis (Rudolphi, 1819)
 Polymorphus nickoli Khan and Bilqees, 1998
 Polymorphus obtusus Van Cleave, 1918
 Polymorphus paradoxus Connell and Corner, 1957
 Polymorphus paucihamatus Heinze, 1936
 Polymorphus phippsi Kostylew, 1922
 Polymorphus piriformis (Bremser in Rudolphi, 1819)
 Polymorphus pupa (von Linstow, 1905)
 Polymorphus sichuanensis Wang and Zhang, 1987
 Polymorphus sindensis Khan, Ghazi and Bilqees, 2002
 Polymorphus spindlatus Amin and Heckmann, 1991
 Polymorphus striatus (Goeze, 1782)
 Polymorphus strumosoides Lundström, 1942
 Polymorphus swartzi Schmidt, 1965
 Polymorphus trochus Van Cleave, 1945

Profilicollis Meyer, 1931

Profilicollis altmani (Perry, 1942) Van Cleave, 1947
Profilicollis antarcticus (Zdzitowiecki, 1985)
Profilicollis arcticus (Van Cleave, 1920)
Profilicollis botulus (Van Cleave, 1916)
Profilicollis chasmagnathi (Holcman-Spector, Mañé-Garzón & Dei-Cas, 1977) Golvan, 1994
Profilicollis formosus (Schmidt & Kuntz, 1967)
Profilicollis major (Lundström, 1942)
Profilicollis novaezelandensis Brockerhoff & Smales, 2002
Profilicollis sphaerocephalus (Bremser in Rudolphi, 1819)

Pseudocorynosoma Aznar, Pérez-Ponce de León & Raga, 2006
Pseudocorynosoma anatarium (Van Cleave, 1945) Aznar, Pérez-Ponce de León & Raga, 2006
Pseudocorynosoma constrictum (Van Cleave, 1918) Aznar, Pérez-Ponce de León & Raga, 2006
Pseudocorynosoma enrietti (Molfi & Fernandes, 1953) Aznar, Pérez-Ponce de León & Raga, 2006
Pseudocorynosoma iheringi (Machado-Filho, 1961) Aznar, Pérez-Ponce de León & Raga, 2006
Pseudocorynosoma peposacae (Porta, 1914) Aznar, Pérez-Ponce de León & Raga, 2006
Pseudocorynosoma tepehuanesi García-Varela, Henández-Orts & Pinacho-Pinacho, 2017

Southwellina Witenberg, 1932

Southwellina hispida (Van Cleave, 1925)
Southwellina macracanthus (Ward and Winter, 1952)
Southwellina sacra Bhattacharya, Pande & Srivastaca, 2002

Tenuisoma

Tenuisoma tarapungi

T. tarapungi was found in the intestines of the red-billed gull (Chroicocephalus scopulinus) on the coast of Otago, New Zealand.

Notes

References

External links

Polymorphidae taxon list
Genera of Polymorphidae at the World Register of Marine Species web-site

 
Polymorphida
Acanthocephala families